Stenocereus griseus, also known as the Mexican organ pipe, dagger cactus, pitaya, and pitayo de mayo, is a species of cactus.

Description

This tree-like cactus can grow up to 9 m tall, with stems up to 12 cm in diameter. Depending on the cactus, the color of the fruit vary from white, yellow, red, and purple being the hardest to find.

Distribution
This species is found in Mexico in Oaxaca and Veracruz, coastal Venezuela, Guajira Peninsula of Colombia and the ABC islands of the Dutch Caribbean.  It is found in scrub-lands. Observations of this species have also been reported in the dry scrub-lands at the base of the Eastern Cordillera of the Colombian Andes.  However it has not been collected in this region.

Ecology
In the Caribbean islands of Aruba, Curaçao and Bonaire, this cactus blooms and fruits profusely during the dry season.  It is a critical resource for bats, birds and other animals.

Human uses  
Its fruit is edible to humans and is considered good tasting.  It is planted as an ornamental and as a living fence in warm regions. When used as a fence, it can be impervious to animals due to its spiny nature.

CITES status
The species is found in CITES Appendix II as a species of Least Concern. Its population is considered stable.

References

griseus